The Irishman (also titled onscreen as I Heard You Paint Houses) is a 2019 American epic crime film directed and produced by Martin Scorsese and written by Steven Zaillian, based on the 2004 book I Heard You Paint Houses by Charles Brandt. It stars Robert De Niro, Al Pacino, and Joe Pesci, with Ray Romano, Bobby Cannavale, Anna Paquin, Stephen Graham, Stephanie Kurtzuba, Jesse Plemons, and Harvey Keitel in supporting roles. The film follows Frank Sheeran (De Niro), a truck driver who becomes a hitman involved with mobster Russell Bufalino (Pesci) and his crime family, including his time working for the powerful Teamster Jimmy Hoffa (Pacino). The film premiered at the 57th New York Film Festival, and had a limited theatrical release on November 1, 2019, followed by digital streaming on Netflix starting on November 27, 2019. Rotten Tomatoes, a review aggregator, surveyed 411 reviews and judged 96% to be positive.

The Irishman received widespread critical acclaim, with particular praise for Scorsese's direction and the performances of De Niro, Pacino, and Pesci. The film received numerous accolades; at the 92nd Academy Awards, it received 10 nominations, including Best Picture, Best Director, Best Supporting Actor for Pacino and Pesci, and Best Adapted Screenplay. Additionally, at the 77th Golden Globe Awards, it was nominated for five awards, including Best Motion Picture – Drama, while it earned 10 nominations at 73rd British Academy Film Awards, including Best Film, but they didn't win any awards. It is Scorsese's second time with ten nominations for a film which did not win any Oscars behind his previous 2002 film, Gangs of New York. As other distinction it shares with 2010's True Grit and 2013's American Hustle, after the 11 for 1977's The Turning Point and 1985's The Color Purple.

Accolades

See also 
 2019 in film

References

External links 
 

Irishman, The